Empty nest can refer to:

Empty nest syndrome, experienced by parents when children move away from their parents' house
Empty Nest, an American television show
Empty Nest (film), a 2008 Argentine drama film